The Bodhisattvacaryāvatāra or Bodhicaryāvatāra (Tibetan: བྱང་ཆུབ་སེམས་དཔའི་སྤྱོད་པ་ལ་འཇུག་པ་ byang chub sems dpa'i spyod pa la 'jug pa; Chinese: 入菩薩行論; Japanese: 入菩薩行論) translated into English as A Guide to the Bodhisattva's Way of Life, is a Mahāyāna Buddhist text written c. 700 AD in Sanskrit verse by Shantideva (Śāntideva), a Buddhist monk at Nālandā Monastic University in India which is also where it was composed.

Structure
It has ten chapters dedicated to the development of bodhicitta (the mind of enlightenment) through the practice of the six perfections (Skt. Pāramitās). The text begins with a chapter describing the benefits of the wish to reach enlightenment.  The sixth chapter, on the perfection of patient endurance (Skt. ), strongly criticizes anger and has been the subject of recent commentaries by Robert Thurman and the fourteenth Dalai Lama. Tibetan scholars consider the ninth chapter, "Wisdom", to be one of the most succinct expositions of the Madhyamaka view. The tenth chapter is used as one of the most popular Mahāyāna prayers.

Chapter summary
 The benefits of bodhicitta (the wish to reach full enlightenment for others)
 Purifying bad deeds
 Adopting the spirit of enlightenment
 Using conscientiousness
 Guarding awareness
 The practice of patience
 The practice of joyous effort
 The practice of meditative concentration
 The perfection of wisdom
 Dedication

Exegetical discourse and commentary
Many Tibetan scholars, such as Jamgön Ju Mipham Gyatso, have written commentaries on this text.

Commentaries and studies in English

References

External links

A Reader's Guide to the Works in English related to the Bodhicaryāvatāra, on Shambhala Publications
A Video Lecture Series by the Padmakara Translation Group's Wulstan Fletcher on the Bodhicaryāvatāra, on Shambhala.com
Multilingual edition of Bodhisattvacaryāvatāra, in the Bibliotheca Polyglotta
Śāntideva's Bodhisattva-caryāvatāra (html) 
The Bodhicaryavatara at BuddhaNet (Tibetan)
Bodhicharyavatara Series - Lotsawa House
Translation of five chapters of a famous Tibetan commentary by Khenpo Kunpal
Bodhicaryāvatāra of Śāntideva: Sanskrit Buddhist text
Bodhisattvacharyavatara - A Guide to the Bodhisattvaʹs Way of Life (Translated into English by Stephen Batchelor)

Mahayana texts
8th-century Indian books
Buddhist commentaries